The Church of the Sacred Heart is a historic Roman Catholic church building in Freeport, Minnesota, United States.  The church was constructed from 1905 to 1906 as the third and largest building to house a congregation formed by the community's German American settlers in 1881.  The property was listed on the National Register of Historic Places in 1991 as Church of the Sacred Heart (Catholic) for its local significance in the theme of social history.  It was nominated for demonstrating the central role played by the Catholic church in Freeport and many other Central Minnesota communities settled by German immigrants.

History

The Sacred Heart parish was originally part of a parish in New Munich, Minnesota. The heavily German-American community of Freeport asked the Diocese of St. Cloud for a priest to form their own parish, and Father Simplicius Wimmer arrived in response. The second building was completed at a cost of $30,000.

The 1896 building was struck by lightning in 1904 and destroyed by fire.  The parish immediately organized a rebuilding effort, and even the priest pitched in.  The third building was even larger and more ornate than the second building, with a total construction cost of $115,000 by the time it was finished in 1906.  It required 38 boxcar loads of brick for its construction.

The parish is now part of a cluster with Immaculate Conception in New Munich and St. Rose of Lima in St. Rosa, Minnesota.

See also
 List of Catholic churches in the United States
 National Register of Historic Places listings in Stearns County, Minnesota

References

External links

 Sacred Heart Parish

1905 establishments in Minnesota
Churches in Stearns County, Minnesota
Churches in the Roman Catholic Diocese of Saint Cloud
German-American culture in Minnesota
Gothic Revival church buildings in Minnesota
National Register of Historic Places in Stearns County, Minnesota
Roman Catholic churches completed in 1906
Churches on the National Register of Historic Places in Minnesota
Romanesque Revival church buildings in Minnesota
20th-century Roman Catholic church buildings in the United States